John Hanlon may refer to:

 John Hanlon (record producer), American record producer and recording engineer
 John Hanlon (footballer) (1892–1876), Scottish footballer with Hamilton Academical and Heart of Midlothian 
 John Hanlon (singer) (born 1949), New Zealand singer and songwriter
 John Hanlon (athlete) (1905–1983), English athlete
 John J. Hanlon (1854–1902), chancellor of the Diocese of Albany
 John Stanislaus Hanlon (1883–1949), journalist and member of the Queensland Legislative Council
John Paul "Jack" Hanlon  (1913–1968), Irish priest and painter
John Hanlon (jockey) Rode in 4 Grand Nationals between 1850 and 1867
Johnny Hanlon (1917-2002), English footballer for Manchester United and Bury, also known as Jimmy Hanlon